OFK Mladost APA is a football club based in Apatin, Vojvodina, Serbia. They compete in the Vojvodina League North, the fourth tier of the national league system.

History
The original club was founded in 1928 as SK Tri zvezde. They played qualifications for the Yugoslav Football Championship in 1933, losing to Split in a two-legged playoff tie (5–4 on aggregate). The club would change its name several times during the late 1930s and early 1940s, competing as Apatinski SK, SK Apatin, and SU Apatin.

In 1951, the club became known as FK Mladost. They competed in the Vojvodina League, the third tier of Yugoslav football, in two spells between 1969 and 1972, and again from 1980 until 1988, when the competition was demoted to become the fourth tier.

After the breakup of Yugoslavia, the club earned promotion to the newly formed Serbian League Vojvodina in 1995. They spent two seasons in the third tier, finishing as champions in 1996–97 to earn promotion to the Second League of FR Yugoslavia. The club played in the second tier for four seasons until 2001, before winning first place in Group North and taking promotion to the First League of FR Yugoslavia for the first time in history. They spent one season in the elite division, finishing second from the bottom.

In 2006, the club earned promotion to the newly formed Serbian SuperLiga. They finished in sixth place in their comeback appearance in the top flight, but were forced to withdraw from the league due to financial difficulties. The club subsequently spent three seasons in the Serbian First League, before suffering relegation to the Serbian League Vojvodina in 2010. They would suffer another relegation in the following 2010–11 season.

In the summer of 2011, when the old club folded, a new club was formed and named OFK Mladost APA, starting off in the Sombor-Apatin-Kula-Odžaci Intermunicipal League, the sixth tier of Serbian football. They would immediately gain promotion to the fifth tier in 2012 and later to the fourth tier in 2014.

Honours
Second League of FR Yugoslavia (Tier 2)
 2000–01 (Group North)
Serbian League Vojvodina (Tier 3)
 1996–97
Sombor-Apatin-Kula-Odžaci Intermunicipal League (Tier 6)
 2011–12

Seasons

Notable players
This is a list of players who have played at full international level.
  Nenad Mišković
  Radoslav Batak
  Miloš Kosanović
  Veseljko Trivunović
  Đorđe Tutorić
  Bojan Brnović
  Nenad Brnović
  Nikola Malbaša
  Boris Vasković
For a list of all FK Mladost Apatin players with a Wikipedia article, see :Category:FK Mladost Apatin players.

Managerial history

References

External links
 
 Club page at Srbijasport

1928 establishments in Serbia
2011 establishments in Serbia
Association football clubs established in 1928
Association football clubs established in 2011
Football clubs in Yugoslavia
Football clubs in Serbia
Football clubs in Vojvodina
Apatin
Phoenix clubs (association football)